The following is a list of Ministers of Foreign Affairs of Venezuela since 1830, when Venezuela achieved independence after the dissolution of Gran Colombia. The founding minister was Diego Bautista Urbaneja, who held multiple terms. The current minister is Felix Plasencia, who assumed office on August 20, 2021.

List

Gallery

See also
List of current foreign ministers
List of presidents of Venezuela
Foreign policy of Venezuela

References

Sources
Rulers.org – Foreign ministers S–Z

Venezuelan Ministers of Foreign Affairs
Foreign Affairs
Venezuela
1830 establishments in Venezuela
Executive branch of the government of Venezuela